Mehmet Tayfun Türkmen (born 23 April 1962, in Turkey) is a Turkish football manager.

References

Living people
Turkish football managers
1962 births
Heart of Lions F.C. managers